''not to be confused with Pokegama Lake, Pine County, Minnesota

Pokegama Lake Dam (National ID MN00584) is a dam in Cohasset, Itasca County, Minnesota, northwest of the city of Grand Rapids.

It impounds the Upper Mississippi River for flood control, navigation, and municipal drinking water. Rebuilt in 1936, the dam is owned and operated by the Mississippi Valley Division of the Corps of Engineers.

The dam creates a system of connected reservoirs with a total maximum capacity of 120,000 acre-feet, and a normal capacity of 82,000 acre-feet: Jay Gould Lake, Cut-Off Lake, and the largest, Pokegama Lake. The dam is the location of a number of Minnesota weather records.

Pedestrian bridge
During rehabilitation work in 2011, a new pedestrian bridge was constructed on the concrete footings on the downstream side of the dam, connecting the Pokegama Recreation Area Campground to the south side of the Mississippi River.

See also
 List of crossings of the Upper Mississippi River

References

External links
USACE page
Historic American Engineering Record (HAER) documentation:
 about six dams including this one

Dams in Minnesota
Reservoirs in Minnesota
United States Army Corps of Engineers dams
Buildings and structures in Itasca County, Minnesota
Dams completed in 1884
Historic American Engineering Record in Minnesota
Lakes of Itasca County, Minnesota